Scopocira is a genus of jumping spiders that was first described by Eugène Louis Simon in 1900.

Species
 it contains fifteen species, found in Central and South America and in the Caribbean:
Scopocira abaporu Costa & Ruiz, 2014 – Trinidad, Bolivia
Scopocira albertoi Galvis, 2015 – Colombia
Scopocira bicornia Costa & Ruiz, 2014 – Brazil
Scopocira carinata Crane, 1945 – Guyana, Trinidad and Tobago, Brazil
Scopocira cepa Costa & Ruiz, 2014 – Brazil
Scopocira crotalica Costa & Ruiz, 2014 – Colombia, Brazil
Scopocira cyrili Costa & Ruiz, 2014 – Guyana, French Guiana
Scopocira dentichelis Simon, 1900 (type) – Costa Rica, Panama, Colombia, Venezuela, Trinidad and Tobago, Brazil
Scopocira fuscimana (Mello-Leitão, 1941) – Brazil
Scopocira histrio Simon, 1900 – Ecuador, Suriname, Brazil, Argentina
Scopocira kunai Costa & Ruiz, 2014 – Trinidad, Brazil
Scopocira melanops (Taczanowski, 1871) – Brazil
Scopocira pterodactyla Costa & Ruiz, 2014 – Brazil
Scopocira sciosciae Costa & Ruiz, 2014 – Brazil
Scopocira tenella Simon, 1900 – Colombia, French Guiana, Brazil

References

External links
 Photographs of Scopocira species

Salticidae
Salticidae genera
Spiders of Central America
Spiders of South America